This page lists all described species of the spider family Dipluridae accepted by the World Spider Catalog :

C

† Cethegoides

† Cethegoides Wunderlich, 2017
 † C. patricki Wunderlich, 2017

† Clostes

† Clostes Menge, 1869
 † C. priscus Menge, 1869

† Cretadiplura

† Cretadiplura Selden, 2006 - Euagrinae

D

† Dinodiplura

† Dinodiplura Selden, 2006 - Euagrinae

Diplura

Diplura C. L. Koch, 1850
 D. annectens (Bertkau, 1880) — Brazil
 D. argentina (Canals, 1931) — Argentina
 D. catharinensis (Mello-Leitão, 1927) — Brazil
 D. erlandi (Tullgren, 1905) — Bolivia
 D. garbei (Mello-Leitão, 1923) — Brazil
 D. garleppi (Simon, 1892) — Bolivia
 D. lineata (Lucas, 1857) — Brazil
 D. macrura (C. L. Koch, 1841) (type) — Brazil
 D. mapinguari Pedroso, Giupponi & Baptista, 2018 — Brazil
 D. nigra (F. O. Pickard-Cambridge, 1896) — Brazil
 D. paraguayensis (Gerschman & Schiapelli, 1940) — Paraguay, Argentina
 D. parallela (Mello-Leitão, 1923) — Brazil
 D. petrunkevitchi (Caporiacco, 1955) — Venezuela
 D. riveti (Simon, 1903) — Ecuador
 D. rodrigoi Pedroso, Giupponi & Baptista, 2018 — Brazil
 D. sanguinea (F. O. Pickard-Cambridge, 1896) — Brazil
 D. studiosa (Mello-Leitão, 1920) — Brazil
 D. taunayi (Mello-Leitão, 1923) — Brazil

E

† Edwa

† Edwa Raven et al., 2015 - Masteriinae

H

Harmonicon

Harmonicon F. O. Pickard-Cambridge, 1896
 H. audeae Maréchal & Marty, 1998 — French Guiana
 H. cerberus Pedroso & Baptista, 2014 — Brazil
 H. oiapoqueae Drolshagen & Bäckstam, 2011 — French Guiana
 H. rufescens F. O. Pickard-Cambridge, 1896 (type) — Brazil

I

† Ischnothele

† Ischnothele Ausserer, 1875 - Euagrinae

L

Linothele

Linothele Karsch, 1879
Linothele cavicola Goloboff, 1994 – Ecuador
Linothele cristata (Mello-Leitão, 1945) – Brazil
Linothele curvitarsis Karsch, 1879 (type) – Venezuela
Linothele fallax (Mello-Leitão, 1926) – Bolivia, Brazil
Linothele gaujoni (Simon, 1889) – Ecuador
Linothele jelskii (F. O. Pickard-Cambridge, 1896) – Peru
Linothele longicauda (Ausserer, 1871) – Ecuador
Linothele macrothelifera Strand, 1908 – Colombia
Linothele melloleitaoi (Brignoli, 1983) – Colombia
Linothele monticolens (Chamberlin, 1916) – Peru
Linothele mubii (Nicoletta, Ochoa, Chaparro & Ferretti, 2022) – Peru
Linothele paulistana (Mello-Leitão, 1924) – Brazil
Linothele pukachumpi Dupérré & Tapia, 2015 – Ecuador
Linothele quori Dupérré & Tapia, 2015 – Ecuador
Linothele septentrionalis Drolshagen & Bäckstam, 2021 – Bahamas
Linothele sericata (Karsch, 1879) – Colombia
Linothele sexfasciata (Schiapelli & Gerschman, 1945) – Venezuela
Linothele spinosa Drolshagen & Bäckstam, 2021 – Peru
Linothele tsachilas Dupérré & Tapia, 2015 – Ecuador
Linothele uniformis Drolshagen & Bäckstam, 2021 – Peru
Linothele yanachanka Dupérré & Tapia, 2015 – Ecuador
Linothele zaia Dupérré & Tapia, 2015 – Ecuador

M

Masteria

Masteria L. Koch, 1873
Masteria aguaruna Passanha & Brescovit, 2018 – Peru
Masteria aimeae (Alayón, 1995) – Cuba
Masteria amarumayu Passanha & Brescovit, 2018 – Brazil
Masteria angienae Víquez, 2020 — Costa Rica (Cocos Is.)
Masteria barona (Chickering, 1966) – Trinidad
Masteria caeca (Simon, 1892) – Philippines
Masteria cavicola (Simon, 1892) – Philippines
Masteria chalupas (Dupérré & Tapia, 2021) — Ecuador
Masteria colombiensis Raven, 1981 – Colombia
Masteria downeyi (Chickering, 1966) – Costa Rica, Panama
Masteria franzi Raven, 1991 – New Caledonia
Masteria galipote Passanha & Brescovit, 2018 – Dominican Rep.
Masteria golovatchi Alayón, 1995 – Cuba
Masteria guyanensis Almeida, Salvatierra & de Morais, 2018 – Guyana
Masteria hirsuta L. Koch, 1873 (type) – Fiji, Micronesia
Masteria jatunsacha (Dupérré & Tapia, 2021) — Ecuador
Masteria kaltenbachi Raven, 1991 – New Caledonia
Masteria lasdamas (Dupérré & Tapia, 2021) — Ecuador
Masteria lewisi (Chickering, 1964) – Jamaica
Masteria lucifuga (Simon, 1889) – Venezuela
Masteria macgregori (Rainbow, 1898) – New Guinea
Masteria machay (Dupérré & Tapia, 2021) — Ecuador
Masteria manauara Bertani, Cruz & Oliveira, 2013 – Brazil
Masteria modesta (Simon, 1892) – St. Vincent
Masteria mutum Passanha & Brescovit, 2018 – Brazil
Masteria otongachi (Dupérré & Tapia, 2021) — Ecuador
Masteria pallida (Kulczyński, 1908) – New Guinea
Masteria papallacta (Dupérré & Tapia, 2021) — Ecuador
Masteria pasochoa (Dupérré & Tapia, 2021) — Ecuador
Masteria pecki Gertsch, 1982 – Jamaica
Masteria petrunkevitchi (Chickering, 1964) – Puerto Rico
Masteria sabrinae Passanha & Brescovit, 2018 – Martinique
Masteria simla (Chickering, 1966) – Trinidad
Masteria soucouyant Passanha & Brescovit, 2018 – Trinidad and Tobago
Masteria spinosa (Petrunkevitch, 1925) – Panama
Masteria tayrona Passanha & Brescovit, 2018 – Colombia
Masteria toddae Raven, 1979 – Australia (Queensland)
Masteria urdujae Rasalan & Barrion-Dupo, 2019 – Philippines (Luzon)
Masteria yacambu Passanha & Brescovit, 2018 – Venezuela

P

† Phyxioschemoides

† Phyxioschemoides Wunderlich, 2015 - Masteriinae
 † P. collembola Wunderlich, 2015

S

† Seldischnoplura

† Seldischnoplura Raven et al., 2015 - Euagrinae

Siremata

Siremata Passanha & Brescovit, 2018
 S. juruti Passanha & Brescovit, 2018 — Brazil
 S. lucasae Passanha & Brescovit, 2018 — Brazil
 S. valteri Passanha & Brescovit, 2018 (type) — Brazil

Striamea

Striamea Raven, 1981
 S. gertschi Raven, 1981 (type) — Colombia
 S. magna Raven, 1981 — Colombia

T

Trechona

Trechona C. L. Koch, 1850
 T. adspersa Bertkau, 1880 — Brazil
 T. cotia Pedroso, de Miranda & Baptista, 2019 — Brazil
 T. diamantina Guadanuccia, Fonseca-Ferreira, Baptista & Pedroso, 2016 — Brazil
 T. excursora Pedroso, de Miranda & Baptista, 2019 — Brazil
 T. rufa Vellard, 1924 — Brazil
 T. uniformis Mello-Leitão, 1935 — Brazil
 T. venosa (Latreille, 1832) (type) — Brazil

References

Dipluridae